Unscripted television may refer to:

 Improvised situation comedy
 Reality television
 Documentary television
 Sports